Mitchell Crowden (born 28 April 1999) is a professional Australian rules footballer who played for the Fremantle Football Club in the Australian Football League (AFL).

Early career

Originally from Meadows in the Adelaide Hills, Crowden played for Sturt in the South Australian National Football League (SANFL), playing in both their 2017 reserves and colts premiership teams.  After testing very well at the South Australian draft combine, where he finished in the top 5 in all six categories, he was then selected by Fremantle with their fourth selection, fifty ninth overall, in the 2017 AFL national draft.

AFL career

Crowden made his AFL debut for Fremantle in the second round of the 2018 AFL season. Crowden signed a two-year contract extension in March 2018 tying him to the club until the end of the 2021 season. Following the conclusion of the 2022 AFL season Mitch was delisted by Fremantle.

Statistics
 Statistics are correct to the end of round 10, 2022

|- style="background-color: #EAEAEA"
! scope="row" style="text-align:center" | 2018
|
| 12 || 9 || 1 || 2 || 38 || 59 || 97 || 21 || 29 || 0.1 || 0.2 || 4.2 || 6.6 || 10.8 || 2.3 || 3.2
|-
! scope="row" style="text-align:center" | 2019
|
| 12 || 5 || 3 || 2 || 27 || 33 || 60 || 8 || 24 || 0.6 || 0.4 || 5.4 || 6.6 || 12.0 || 1.6 || 4.8
|- style="background-color: #EAEAEA"
! scope="row" style="text-align:center" | 2020
|
| 12 || 10 || 6 || 1 || 50 || 34 || 84 || 15 || 47 || 0.6 || 0.1 || 5.0 || 3.4 || 8.4 || 1.5 || 4.7
|-
! scope="row" style="text-align:center" | 2021
|
| 12 || 16 || 5 || 7 || 70 || 97 || 167 || 34 || 29 || 0.3 || 0.4 || 4.4 || 6.1 || 10.4 || 2.1 || 1.8
|- style="background-color: #EAEAEA"
! scope="row" style="text-align:center" | 2022
|
| 12 || 0 || – || – || – || – || – || – || – || – || – || – || – || – || – || –
|- class="sortbottom"
! colspan=3| Career
! 40
! 15
! 12
! 185
! 223
! 408
! 78
! 129
! 0.4
! 0.3
! 4.6
! 5.6
! 10.2
! 2.0
! 3.2
|}

Notes

References

External links

 
WAFL Player Profile and Statistics

1999 births
Living people
Fremantle Football Club players
Sturt Football Club players
Peel Thunder Football Club players
Australian rules footballers from South Australia
People educated at Prince Alfred College